Line 5, currently known as Cornellà Centre – Vall d'Hebron, its termini, and often called "Línia Blava" (Blue line), is a rapid transit metro line belonging to the Barcelona Metro network operated by TMB, and part of the ATM fare-integrated transport network.

Overview
It opened in 1959 as the line 2  (originally).

Chronology

1959 – Sagrera-Vilapicina section opened (as the former L2)
1967 – Vilapicina-Horta section opened (as the former L2)
1969 – Collblanc-Diagonal/Provença section opened.
1970 – Diagonal/Provença-Sagrera-Vilapicina section opened. The line then known as L2 integrated into L5.
1973 – Collblanc-Pubilla Cases section opened.
1976 – Pubilla Cases-Sant Ildefons section opened.
1983 – Sant Ildefons-Cornellà section opened.
2010 – Horta-Vall d'Hebron section opened.
2021 – Ernest Lluch station opened.

Current stations

External links
 Official site for Transports Metropolitans de Barcelona
 Catalan Wikipedia article on the metro network

5
Transport in Eixample
Transport in Horta-Guinardó
Transport in Nou Barris
Transport in Sant Andreu
Transport in Sants-Montjuïc
Transport in Cornellà de Llobregat
Transport in Esplugues de Llobregat
Transport in L'Hospitalet de Llobregat
Railway lines opened in 1959
Standard gauge railways in Spain